Najm Shwan (born 9 July 1997) is an Iraqi footballer who plays as a defender for Al-Zawraa in Iraqi Premier League, as well as the Iraq national team.

International career
On 11 August 2019, Shwan made his first international cap with Iraq against Yemen in the 2019 WAFF Championship.

Honours
Al-Zawraa
Iraqi Premier League: 2015–16
Iraq FA Cup: 2016–17, 2018–19

References

External links
 Player bio

1997 births
Living people
Association football defenders
Iraqi footballers
Iraqi expatriate footballers
Iraq international footballers
Iraqi expatriate sportspeople in the United Arab Emirates
Expatriate footballers in the United Arab Emirates
Expatriate footballers in Slovenia
Slovenian PrvaLiga players
Al Dhafra FC players
NK Rudar Velenje players
Al-Zawraa SC players